Richard Charles Harrington (1956-10-22 in Birmingham – 2004-05-23 in Manchester) was professor of child and adolescent psychiatry at the University of Manchester, England. His work on psychiatric disorders of children and adolescents, especially on children with depressive illness, is a milestone in this medical field.

External links
 Article on his death in the Bulletin of the International Association of Child and Adolescent Psychiatry and Allied Professions (Association Internationale de Psychiatrie de l’Enfant et de l’Adolescent et des Professions Associées, IACAPAP), August 2004

British child psychiatrists
1956 births
2004 deaths
People from Birmingham, West Midlands
Academics of the Victoria University of Manchester
British psychiatrists